The Lambda Literary Award for Bisexual Literature is an annual literary award, presented by the Lambda Literary Foundation, that awards books with bisexual content. The award can be separated into three categories: bisexual fiction, bisexual nonfiction, and bisexual poetry. Awards are granted based on literary merit and bisexual content, and therefore, the writer may be homo-, hetero-, or asexual.

Criteria

Bisexual fiction 
The award for bisexual fiction recognizes "[n]ovels, novellas, short story collections, and anthologies with prominent bi/pan ... characters and/or content of strong significance to the bi/pan ... communities." The list "[m]ay include historical novels, comics, cross-genre works of fiction, humor, and other styles of fiction."

Bisexual nonfiction 
The award for bisexual nonfiction recognizes "[n]onfiction works with content of strong significance to members of the bi/[pan] communities," including "a wide range of subjects for the general or academic reader."

Bisexual poetry 
The award for bisexual poetry recognizes individual volumes of poems and poem collections with bisexual content. Chapbooks are ineligible for the prize, as well as "[u]pdated editions of previously published works ... unless at least 50% of the poetry (not the supplemental text) is new." If there are not enough eligible titles in any given year to support a dedicated bisexual poetry category, then bisexual poetry titles are considered in the fiction category.

Bisexual/Transgender literature 
In 2001, the Lambda Literary Foundation presented one award for books with bisexual and/or transgender themes.

Recipients

References 

Bisexual Literature
Lists of LGBT-related award winners and nominees
Bisexuality-related literature
English-language literary awards